Hardap Dam is a dam close to Mariental in the Hardap Region of central Namibia. Created in 1963 while Namibia was under South African occupation, Hardap Dam is the largest dam in the country. The reservoir dams the Fish River and is home to numerous examples of wildlife of Namibia.

Description
Construction began in 1960 and completed in 1963.

Hardap Dam supplies Mariental and the surrounding settlements with potable water. Its location close to the city, however, also poses a danger of flooding it when sluices have to be opened fully due to good rains in the Fish River's catchment area. Reed grasses growing in the riverbed of Fish slow down the flow of water and further aggravate the danger of flooding.

Before the dam was built, Mariental was flooded in 1923 and 1934. Floods after the commissioning of the dam occurred in 1972, 1974, 1976, 2000, and 2006. Since then, the dam's water level is kept at a maximum of 70% of its capacity to prevent both an overflow and an uncontrolled outflow through fully opened sluices.

Etymology
The name Hardap derives from the Nama word meaning "nipple" or "wart", which is how the surrounding area of low conical-shaped hills appeared to the early inhabitants. There are fishing spots at various points along the northern shore of the lake. Permits, and a map of permitted fishing areas, are available from the resort office, or from the magistrate's office in Mariental.

Flora and fauna
The area is home to the black rhino, gemsbok, Hartmann's zebra, kudu, ostrich, springbok and steenbok. There is also a large variety of bird species can be observed in and around the dam. Great White Pelican, cormorant, darter and spoonbill can be seen on the lake itself, as well as fish eagle and a small number of osprey.

The vegetation in the area is classified as dwarf shrub savanna. The following trees occur: camel thorn, wild green-hair tree and buffalo thorn.

Tourism
After a four-year period of renovation the dam's recreational sites have been reopened in 2016. Activities at the dam include swimming, fishing, and bird watching. There is a restaurant and a shop.

References 

1963 establishments in South West Africa
Dams completed in 1963
Buildings and structures in Hardap Region
Dams in Namibia